Colm de Bhailís (2 May 1796 – 27 February 1906) was an Irish poet, songwriter, stonemason and centenarian who lived to be 109 years old.

Biography
De Bhailís was from Lettermullen, Connemara. A stonemason who traveled extensively throughout Ireland, he is believed to have lived for some time in Kilrush, County Clare, and Westport, County Mayo. Amhrán a Tei and Cúirt a tSruthán Bhuí, were the best-known of the at least seventeen poems he is known to have written. He is recorded living at the poorhouse at Cregg, Oughterard. County Galway in the British census of 1901 as simply CW, aged 105. (Wallace being the anglicised version of his surname). 

Thanks to the efforts of Pádraig Pearse and Éamon de Valera he was moved from the poorhouse to lodge with the O'Toole family, Main Street, Oughterard. He lived until he was 109 years old, falling a few months shy of supercentenarian status, and was buried in Oughterard's Kilcummin Old Cemetery.

Personal life and death
He was twice a widower. His second wife, Úna, died around 1900. He had a son by his first wife, Siobhán Frainc Ní Lochlainn. The boy was baptised Tomás and died in 1877, aged twenty-two.

Bibliography
Amhrán Chuilm de Bhailís (1904), ed. by J.H. Lloyd, with notices by Douglas Hyde and Pádraig Pearse.

References

External links
https://www.ainm.ie/Bio.aspx?ID=11
https://www.ainm.ie/Bio.aspx?ID=11
http://www.oughterardheritage.org/content/people/colm_de_bhails
Profile, anghaeltacht.net; accessed 22 July 2017.
Profile, jstor.org; accessed 22 July 2017.
 

1796 births
1906 deaths
19th-century Irish-language poets
Irish centenarians
Irish poets
Irish male songwriters
Men centenarians
People from County Galway
Stonemasons